Esty Amukwaya (born 1988) is a Namibian footballer who plays as a defender for Unam Bokkies in the NFA Women Super league and she is an important member of the Namibian National Women soccer team (The Brave Gladiators).

Amukwaya can also play as a central defender, goalkeeper and central midfielder. She wears number 15 for the Bokkies and number 14 for national games.

Amukwaya is a big fan of former Brave Warriors striker Gerros Witbeen. She played four matches for the Brave Gladiators, two against Tanzania in the 2012 African Women Championship qualifiers and two against the visiting German national student team.

Club career

UNAM Bokkies FC
In the WSL she was voted as the best defender in the league over the past few years and last season (2011/2012) she was nominated among the best players of the season which was taken by Lovisa Mulunga of JS Academy. Jacqui Shipanga Academy as the team is known are the 2011/12 NFA Women Super League Champions. Esty's Unam Bokkies finished fifth in the 2011/2012 season, the league had six teams in total, including former dominant champions Okahandja Beauties. Other teams that competed in the NFA Women Super Leagues are Poly Babes, 21 Brigade United and Challengers. The league is said to expand in the 2012/2013 season to make it more competitive.

Brave Gladiators
In 2012, she made her National debut against Tanzania in the African Women Championship qualifiers.

References

External links
https://web.archive.org/web/20131009221749/http://www.newera.com.na/articles/46453/Botswana-goes-down-2-0-to-Namibian-ladies 
http://allafrica.com/stories/201206051027.html
http://www.namibiasport.com.na/node/24660 
http://www.namibian.com.na/index.php?id=28&tx_ttnews%5Btt_news%5D=100124&no_cache=1
Gladiators ready for battle

1988 births
Living people
Namibian women's footballers
Namibia women's international footballers
Women's association football defenders